The Electric Production Car Series (previously known as the Electric GT Championship) is a proposed zero-emission international auto racing championship organized by Electric GT Holdings. The inaugural season was planned to take place in 2018, but was cancelled due to a lack of a lead investor.

Format
Each race weekend were to consist of a 20-minute practice session and a 30-minute qualifying session followed by two races, one day race and one dusk race, each lasting 60 kilometers. The organizer also intended to run an electric kart racing series to recruit drivers.

Car
For the inaugural season of the championship, all teams were to be supplied with identical versions of a modified Tesla Model S, with the intention of introducing other manufacturers later.

The initial Tesla model announced for the championship was the Model S P85, which was later updated to the Model S P100D for tests on the Circuit de Calafat in Spain in December 2016. The car was modified with improved brakes, suspension, aerodynamics, and an overall reduction of weight. Pirelli would be the sole tire supplier, and MAGNUM CAP would provide charging systems consisting of a 20 CHAdeMO-standard fast charger, which would charge the vehicles at a rate of 55 kW.

In January 2017, the car was tested and filmed on the Circuit Pau-Arnos in France.

Specifications
 Front spoiler and rear wing downforce (DTM-spec): 500/900 N at 250 km/h
 Top speed: 250 km/h
 Acceleration (0–100 km/h): 2.1 sec
 Maximum power: 585 kW (795 hp)
 Battery: 100 kWh lithium-ion battery
 Drive: All-wheel drive
 Torque: 995 Nm

See also
 Electric motorsport

References

Sports car racing series
One-make series
Green racing